Khairpur Tamewali is a city and the capital of Khairpur Tamewali Tehsil, Bahawalpur District, Punjab, Pakistan.

History
It was ruled by a Jadobansi Rajput king named Lakhi Rai Jadhaun till 1750, when Ahmad Shah Abdali seized it from the Raav.
Khairpur Tamewali was known as only Khairpur in the early 18th century. It was named after "Tommy", an Englishman who discovered a meteor which fell in early 1900 at the junction of the Sidhnai Mailsi Link river and the Bahawal canal. The meteor is still viewable at a museum in London, England. The name became Khairpur Tamewali with the passage of time.

Shrine of famous Sufi saint Peer Syed Ghulam Mohyudin Gillani (Peer Syed Chup Shah Sarkar) is located near Khairpur Tamiwali Police Station, he is one of the descendants of Ghaus Pak Syed Abdul Qadir Gillani and also from the family of Muhammad. His son Chan Peer is also interred with him.

Another ancient 200+ years old Shrine of Syed Badar Shah Gillani is present nearby.

Hazrat Khawaja Khuda Bux shrine is also famous for its annual event gatherings for Mela (Urs Khwaja Khuda Bux).

References

Populated places in Bahawalpur District